Beck – Levande begravd is a 2009 film about the Swedish police detective Martin Beck directed by Harald Hamrell.

The 26th film in the series of chief inspector Martin Beck, with Peter Haber in the role of Beck and Mikael Persbrandt as Gunvald Larsson. It was directed by Harald Hamrell, the producer was Lars Blomgren and the production company was Filmlance. Recording began in September 2008. Additional members of the cast include Stina Rautelin, Ingvar Hirdwall, Måns Nathanaelson, Rebecka Hemse and Jessica Zandén.

Plot 
In a playground in a park, a child finds a buried wooden box, and police discover that it contains the body of a famous and well-respected prosecutor. Martin Beck and his police team initially suspect the criminal leader of a motorcycle gang of the attack, but they have to re-evaluate the case once the gang leader is found murdered, his corpse in a similar wooden box. Soon, more wooden boxes are found and the police realise that they are part of a cat and mouse game with a serial killer. The investigation soon shows that there is a connection between the victims in the form of an event nine years ago, and police think that they know the identity of the killer; but what Martin Beck does not suspect is that his own life is at stake too, as the real murderer has chosen him as the next victim.

Production

Cast 
 Peter Haber as Martin Beck
 Mikael Persbrandt as Gunvald Larsson
 Stina Rautelin as Lena Klingström
 Måns Nathanaelson as Oskar Bergman
 Ingvar Hirdwall as Martin Beck's neighbour
 Rebecka Hemse as Inger (Martin Beck's daughter)
 Jessica Zandén as Annika Runfelt

Reception

References

External links 

2009 television films
2009 films
2000s Swedish-language films
Martin Beck films
2000s crime films
Films directed by Harald Hamrell
2000s police procedural films
2000s Swedish films